The chief of naval operations (CNO) is the professional head of the United States Navy. The position is a statutory office held by an admiral who is a military adviser and deputy to the secretary of the Navy. In a separate capacity as a member of the Joint Chiefs of Staff, the CNO is a military adviser to the National Security Council, the Homeland Security Council, the secretary of defense, and the president. The current chief of naval operations is Admiral Michael M. Gilday.

Despite the title, the CNO does not have operational command authority over naval forces. The CNO is an administrative position based in the Pentagon, and exercises supervision of Navy organizations as the designee of the secretary of the Navy. Operational command of naval forces falls within the purview of the combatant commanders who report to the secretary of defense.

Appointment, rank, and responsibilities

The chief of naval operations (CNO) is typically the highest-ranking officer on active duty in the U.S. Navy unless the chairman and/or the vice chairman of the Joint Chiefs of Staff are naval officers. The CNO is nominated for appointment by the president, for a four-year term of office, and must be confirmed by the Senate. A requirement for being Chief of Naval Operations is having significant experience in joint duty assignments, which includes at least one full tour of duty in a joint duty assignment as a flag officer. However, the president may waive those requirements if he determines that appointing the officer is necessary for the national interest. The chief can be reappointed to serve one additional term, but only during times of war or national emergency declared by Congress. By statute, the CNO is appointed as a four-star admiral.

As per , whenever there is a vacancy for the chief of naval operations or during the absence or disability of the chief of naval operations, and unless the president directs otherwise, the vice chief of naval operations performs the duties of the chief of naval operations until a successor is appointed or the absence or disability ceases.

Department of the Navy
The CNO also performs all other functions prescribed under , such as presiding over the Office of the Chief of Naval Operations (OPNAV), exercising supervision of Navy organizations, and other duties assigned by the secretary or higher lawful authority, or the CNO delegates those duties and responsibilities to other officers in OPNAV or in organizations below.

Acting for the secretary of the Navy, the CNO also designates naval personnel and naval forces available to the commanders of unified combatant commands, subject to the approval of the secretary of defense.

Joint Chiefs of Staff
Like the other members of the Joint Chiefs of Staff, the CNO is an administrative position, with no operational command authority over the United States Navy forces.

Members of the Joint Chiefs of Staff, individually or collectively, in their capacity as military advisers, shall provide advice to the president, the National Security Council (NSC), or the secretary of defense (SECDEF) on a particular matter when the president, the NSC, or SECDEF requests such advice. Members of the Joint Chiefs of Staff (other than the chairman of the Joint Chiefs of Staff) may submit to the chairman advice or an opinion in disagreement with, or advice or an opinion in addition to, the advice presented by the chairman to the president, NSC, or SECDEF.

When performing his JCS duties, the CNO is responsible directly to the SECDEF, but keeps SECNAV fully informed of significant military operations affecting the duties and responsibilities of the SECNAV, unless SECDEF orders otherwise.

History

Early attempts and the Aide for Naval Operations (1900–1915)

In 1900, administrative and operational authority over the Navy was concentrated in the secretary of the Navy and bureau chiefs, with the General Board holding only advisory powers. Critics of the lack of military command authority included Charles J. Bonaparte, Navy secretary from 1905 to 1906, then-Captain Reginald R. Belknap and future admiral William Sims. 

Rear Admiral George A. Converse, commander of the Bureau of Navigation (BuNav) from 1905 to 1906, reported:

However, reorganization attempts were opposed by Congress due to fears of a Prussian-style general staff and inadvertently increasing the powers of the Navy secretary, which risked infringing on legislative authority. Senator Eugene Hale, chairman of the Senate Committee on Naval Affairs, disliked reformers like Sims and persistently blocked attempts to bring such ideas to debate.

To circumvent the opposition, George von Lengerke Meyer, Secretary of the Navy under William Howard Taft implemented a system of "aides" on 18 November 1909. These aides lacked command authority and instead served as principal advisors to the Navy secretary. The aide for operations was deemed by Meyer to be the most important one, responsible for devoting "his entire attention and study to the operations of the fleet," and drafting orders for the movement of ships on the advice of the General Board and approval of the secretary in times of war or emergency.

The successes of Meyer's first operations aide, Rear Admiral Richard Wainwright, factored into Meyer's decision to make his third operations aide, Rear Admiral Bradley A. Fiske his de facto principal advisor on 10 February 1913. Fiske retained his post under Meyer's successor, Josephus Daniels, becoming the most prominent advocate for what would become the office of CNO.

Creating the position of Chief of Naval Operations (1915)

In 1914, Fiske, frustrated at Daniels' ambivalence towards his opinion that the Navy was unprepared for the possibility of entry into World War I, bypassed the secretary to collaborate with Representative Richmond P. Hobson, a retired Navy admiral, to draft legislation providing for the office of "a chief of naval operations". The preliminary proposal (passed off as Hobson's own to mask Fiske's involvement), in spite of Daniels' opposition, passed Hobson's subcommittee unanimously on 4 January 1915, and passed the full House Committee on Naval Affairs on 6 January.

Fiske's younger supporters expected him to be named the first chief of naval operations, and his versions of the bill provided for the minimum rank of the officeholder to be a two-star rear admiral.

In contrast, Daniels' version, included in the final bill, emphasized the office's subordination to the Navy secretary, allowed for the selection of the CNO from officers of the rank of captain, and denied it authority over the Navy's general direction:

Fiske's "end-running" of Daniels eliminated any possibility of him being named the first CNO. Nevertheless, satisfied with the change he had helped enact, Fiske made a final contribution: elevating the statutory rank of the CNO to admiral with commensurate pay. The Senate passed the appropriations bill creating the CNO position and its accompanying office on 3 March 1915, simultaneously abolishing the aides system promulgated under Meyer.

Benson, the first CNO (1915–1919)

Captain William S. Benson was promoted to the temporary rank of rear admiral and become the first CNO on 11 May 1915. He further assumed the rank of admiral after the passage of the 1916 Naval Appropriations Bill with Fiske's amendments, second only to Admiral of the Navy George Dewey and explicitly senior to the commanders-in-chief of the Atlantic, Pacific and Asiatic Fleets.

Unlike Fiske, who had campaigned for a powerful, aggressive CNO sharing authority with the Navy secretary, Benson demonstrated personal loyalty to Secretary Daniels and subordinated himself to civilian control, yet maintained the CNO's autonomy where necessary. While alienating reformers like Sims and Fiske (who retired in 1916), Benson's conduct gave Daniels immense trust in his new CNO, and Benson was delegated greater resources and authority.

Achievements

Among the organizational efforts initiated or recommended by Benson included an advisory council to coordinate high-level staff activities, composed of himself, the SECNAV and the bureau chiefs which "worked out to the great satisfaction" of Daniels and Benson; the reestablishment of the Joint Army and Navy Board in 1918 with Benson as its Navy member; and the consolidation of all matters of naval aviation under the authority of the CNO. 

Benson also revamped the structure of the naval districts, transferring authority for them from SECNAV to the Office of the Chief of Naval Operations under the Operations, Plans, Naval Districts division. This enabled closer cooperation between naval district commanders and the uniformed leadership, who could more easily handle communications between the former and the Navy's fleet commanders.

In the waning years of his tenure, Benson set regulations for officers on shore duty to have temporary assignments with the Office of the Chief of Naval Operations to maintain cohesion between the higher-level staff and the fleet.

Establishing OPNAV

Until 1916, the CNO's office was chronically understaffed. The formal establishment of the CNO's "general staff", the Office of the Chief of Naval Operations (OPNAV), originally called the Office for Operations, was exacerbated by Eugene Hale's retirement from politics in 1911, and skepticism of whether the CNO's small staff could implement President Wilson's policy of "preparedness" without violating American neutrality in World War I. 

By June 1916, OPNAV was organized into eight divisions: Operations, Plans, Naval Districts; Regulations; Ship Movements; Communications; Publicity; and Materiel. Operations provided a link between fleet commanders and the General Board, Ship Movements coordinated the movement of Navy vessels and oversaw navy yard overhauls, Communications accounted for the Navy's developing radio network, Publicity conducted the Navy's public affairs, and the Materiel section coordinated the work of the naval bureaus.

Numbering only 75 staffers in January 1917, OPNAV increased in size following the American entry into World War I, as it was deemed of great importance to manage the rapid mobilization of forces to fight in the war. By war's end, OPNAV employed over 1462 people. The CNO and OPNAV thus gained influence over Navy administration but at the expense of the Navy secretary and bureau chiefs.

Advisor to the president

In 1918, Benson became a military advisor to Edward M. House, an advisor and confidant of President Wilson, joining him on a trip to Europe as the 1918 armistice with Germany was signed. His stance that the United States remain equal to Great Britain in naval power was very useful to House and Wilson, enough for Wilson to insist Benson remain in Europe until after the Treaty of Versailles was signed in July 1919.

End of tenure
Benson's tenure as CNO was slated to end on 10 May 1919, but this was delayed by the president at Secretary Daniels' insistence; Benson instead retired on 25 September 1919. Admiral Robert Coontz replaced Benson as CNO on 1 November 1919.

Interwar period (1919–1939)

The CNO's office faced no significant changes in authority during the interwar period, largely due to the Navy secretaries opting to keep executive authority within their own office. Innovations during this period included encouraging coordination in war planning process, and compliance with the Washington Naval Treaty while still keeping to the shipbuilding plan authorized by the Naval Act of 1916. and implementing the concept of naval aviation into naval doctrine.

CNO Pratt, relationship with the General Board and Army-Navy relations

William V. Pratt became the fifth Chief of Naval Operations on 17 September 1930, after the resignation of Charles F. Hughes. He had previously served as assistant chief of naval operations under CNO Benson. A premier naval policymaker and supporter of arms control under the Washington Naval Treaty, Pratt, despite otherwise good relations, clashed with President Herbert Hoover over building up naval force strength to treaty levels, with Hoover favoring restrictions in spending due to financial difficulties caused by the Great Depression. Under Pratt, such a "treaty system" was needed to maintain a compliant peacetime navy.

Pratt opposed centralized management of the Navy, and encouraged diversity of opinion between the offices of the Navy secretary, CNO and the Navy's General Board. To this effect, Pratt removed the CNO as an ex officio member of the General Board, concerned that the office's association with the Board could hamper diversities of opinion between the former and counterparts within the offices of the Navy secretary and OPNAV. Pratt's vision of a less powerful CNO also clashed with Representative Carl Vinson of Georgia, chair of the House Naval Affairs Committee from 1931 to 1947, a proponent of centralizing power within OPNAV. Vinson deliberately delayed many of his planned reorganization proposals until Pratt's replacement by William H. Standley to avoid the unnecessary delays that would otherwise have happened with Pratt.

Pratt also enjoyed a good working relationship with Army chief of staff Douglas MacArthur, and negotiated several key agreements with him over coordinating their services' radio communications networks, mutual interests in coastal defense, and authority over Army and Navy aviation.

CNO Standley and the Vinson-Trammell act

William H. Standley, who succeeded Pratt in 1933, had a weaker relationship with President Franklin D. Roosevelt than Pratt enjoyed with Hoover. Often in direct conflict with Navy secretary Claude A. Swanson and assistant secretary Henry L. Roosevelt, Standley's hostility to the latter was described as "poisonous". 

Conversely, Standley successfully improved relations with Congress, streamlining communications between the Department of the Navy and the naval oversight committees by appointing the first naval legislative liaisons, the highest-ranked of which reported to the judge advocate general. Standley also worked with Representative Vinson to pass the Vinson-Trammell Act, considered by Standley to be his most important achievement as CNO. The Act authorized the President:

This effectively provided security for all Navy vessels under construction; even if new shipbuilding projects could not be initiated, shipbuilders with new classes under construction could not legally be obliged to cease operations, allowing the Navy to prepare for World War II without breaking potential limits from future arms control conferences. The Act also granted the CNO "soft oversight power" of the naval bureaus which nominally lay with the secretary of the Navy, as Standley gradually inserted OPNAV into the ship design process. Under Standley, the "treaty system" created by Pratt was abandoned.

CNO Leahy

Outgoing commander, Battle Force William D. Leahy succeeded Standley as CNO on 2 January 1937. Leahy's close personal friendship with President Roosevelt since his days as Navy assistant secretary, as well as good relationships with Representative Vinson and Secretary Swanson brought him to the forefront of potential candidates for the post. Unlike Standley, who tried to dominate the bureaus, Leahy preferred to let the bureau chiefs function autonomously as per convention, with the CNO acting as a primus inter pares. Leahy's views of the CNO's authority led to clashes with his predecessor; Standley even attempted to block Leahy from being assigned a fleet command in retaliation. Leahy, on his part, continued Standley's efforts to insert the CNO into the ship design process.

Swanson's ill health and assistant secretary Henry Roosevelt's death on 22 February 1936 gave Leahy unprecedented influence. Leahy had private lunches with the President frequently; during his tenure as CNO, Roosevelt had 52 meetings with him, compared with 12 with his Army counterpart, General Malin Craig, none of which were private lunches. 

Leahy retired from the Navy on 1 August 1939 to become Governor of Puerto Rico, a month before the invasion of Poland.

Official residence
Number One Observatory Circle, located on the northeast grounds of the United States Naval Observatory in Washington, DC, was built in 1893 for its superintendent. The chief of naval operations liked the house so much that in 1923 he took over the house as his own official residence. It remained the residence of the CNO until 1974, when Congress authorized its transformation to an official residence for the vice president. The chief of naval operations currently resides in Quarters A in the Washington Naval Yard.

Office of the Chief of Naval Operations

The chief of naval operations presides over the Navy Staff, formally known as the Office of the Chief of Naval Operations (OPNAV). 
The Office of the Chief of Naval Operations is a statutory organization within the executive part of the Department of the Navy, and its purpose is to furnish professional assistance to the secretary of the Navy (SECNAV) and the CNO in carrying out their responsibilities. 

Under the authority of the CNO, the director of the Navy Staff (DNS) is responsible for day-to-day administration of the Navy Staff and coordination of the activities of the deputy chiefs of naval operations, who report directly to the CNO. The office was previously known as the assistant vice chief of naval operations (AVCNO) until 1996, when CNO Jeremy Boorda ordered its redesignation to its current name. Previously held by a three-star vice admiral, the position became a civilian's billet in 2018. The present DNS is Andrew S. Haueptle, a retired Marine Corps colonel.

List of chiefs of naval operations
(† - died in office)

Aide for Naval Operations (historical predecessor office)

Chiefs of Naval Operations

Timeline

See also
Vice Chief of Naval Operations
Master Chief Petty Officer of the Navy
Organization of the US Marine Corps – Relationship with other uniformed services
United States Fleet
Structure of the United States Navy

Notes

Non-footnotes

References

External links

 – Chief Naval Operations
Office of the Chief of Naval Operations organization

Joint Chiefs of Staff
 
United States